The men's 400 metres hurdles event at the 1998 Commonwealth Games was held 16–18 September on National Stadium, Bukit Jalil.

Medalists

Results

Heats
Qualification: First 2 of each heat (Q) and the next 2 fastest (q) qualified for the final.

Final

References

400
1998